The Mandsaur stone inscription of Yashodharman-Vishnuvardhana, is a Sanskrit inscription in the Gupta script dated to about 532 CE, on a slate stone measuring about 2 feet broad, 1.5 feet high and 2.5 inches thick found in the Malwa region of India, now a large part of the southwestern Madhya Pradesh. On the back are engraved a sign of sun and moon, as well as two horsemen. The inscription opens with the sign for siddham, is entirely in verse of various meters, and is signed at the end with the name of the engraver. The script says Fleet belongs to the "northern class of alphabet", and opens with invocations to Hindu god Shiva.

Location
The inscription was discovered accidentally during repairs of an unknown water well, where the inscription was on concealed side of a block in its wall. It had already been removed from the well when first witnessed by Fleet, but Fleet was unable to determine which and he guessed that it may be the original well may be the ancient one located just inside of the eastern entrance of modern Mandsaur Fort.

Description
The inscription records the construction of a well by a person named Daksha in Dashapura (modern Mandsaur, also often spelled Mandasor and referred to as Dasor. It mentions the rule of Yashodharman. The builder of the well, named Daksha, is described as the younger brother of Dharmadosha, himself a minister of Yashodharman. Daksha built the well in honor of his deceased uncle Abhayadatta, also minister of Yashodharman, in charge of the tract of country between the Vindhyas and the Pariyatra mountain and the "Western Ocean". According to the inscription, Daksha was the grandson of a Brahmin Ravikirtti, whose wife was named Bhanugupta, a Kshatriya. This, states Fleet, means that during this period Brahmin and Kshatriya were intermarrying, something seen in other inscriptions such as the Ghatotkacha cave inscription.

The inscription mentions the victories of local ruler Yasodharman over Northern and Eastern kingdoms, with "peaceful overtures and by war". These kingdoms are not further specified..

Fleet's translation of the inscription
The inscription was translated by John Faithfull Fleet in Corpus Inscriptionum Indicarum: Inscriptions of the Early Guptas in 1888 (line numbers and paragraph titles are part of the original text):

References

Gupta and post-Gupta inscriptions
Sanskrit inscriptions in India
6th-century inscriptions